Ellen Gezina Maria van Langen (born 9 February 1966) is a Dutch former middle distance runner, who specialised in the 800 metres. A talented but injury-ridden athlete, she was the 1992 Olympic Champion for the women's 800 meters. She is now the director of the FBK games (the Hengelo meeting).

Career
Van Langen was born in Oldenzaal, Overijssel. Before she started running she played football. She only started to run seriously at 20. In 1989, she won her first of four national championships in the 800 meters and went on to win a silver medal behind Ana Quirot (Cuba) at the World Student Games (Universiade), running 1:59.82. In 1990, she finished fourth in the final of the European Championships in Split, with a Dutch national record of 1:57.57, behind the East German athletes Sigrun Wodars (gold), Christine Wachtel (silver) and Liliya Nurutdinova (bronze) from the Soviet Union.

During the year 1991, she was troubled by an Achilles tendon injury. At the Tokyo World Championships she was eliminated in the heats. The next year, leading up to the 1992 Olympic Games in Barcelona, she defeated Tokyo gold medallist Liliya Nurutdinova at the Fanny Blankers-Koen Games in Hengelo on 28 June in 1:56.66, the fastest time of the season prior to the Games. Just two weeks before the Olympics, she ran another fast time of 1:56.92 at Hechtel.

At the 1992 Olympic Games in Barcelona, Van Langen won the Olympic title in the 800 metres in a time of 1:55.54, a time which is still the Dutch national record. Fearing her final sprint, her competitors including favorites Nurutdinova, Quirot, Ella Kovacs (Romania) and Maria Mutola (Mozambique) set a rapid pace, running the first lap in a very fast time of 55.73, with Van Langen only in 6th position. Entering the final stretch Nurutdinova, who had led the final from the start, had a slight lead but Van Langen moved through on the inside in the last 50m to win a surprise victory, beating Nurutdinova (silver) and Quirot (bronze).

The year 1992 remained her top year, when she won 10 of her 11 800m races. After her Olympic triumph, she was plagued by various injuries. Her best result after 1992 was a 6th-place finish at the 1995 World Championships at Gothenburg. The ongoing injuries prevented her from defending her Olympic title in 1996. She retired from the sport in 1998.

Van Langen later explained the secret of her success. "I think what I could do well is I could die very well in a race and still continue,” she said. “That is very hard, because it hurts running the 800 meters. You have to overcome some boundaries in yourself to continue when it hurts like hell. I was good at it. If the Olympic race would have been run by each athlete individual and the fastest time was the winner I would not have won." She added: "I was also good in tactics, looking around me and taking the right decisions."

After her gold medal win in 1992 the Amsterdam unemployment benefits office terminated her dole on grounds that she might earn money from her victory in the future. She has a degree in economics from the University of Amsterdam, and currently works as an event manager for Global Sports Communication.

References

External links
 
 
 
 

 
 

1966 births
Living people
Athletes (track and field) at the 1992 Summer Olympics
Dutch female middle-distance runners
Medalists at the 1992 Summer Olympics
Olympic athletes of the Netherlands
Olympic gold medalists for the Netherlands
People from Oldenzaal
Olympic gold medalists in athletics (track and field)
Universiade medalists in athletics (track and field)
Universiade silver medalists for the Netherlands
Medalists at the 1989 Summer Universiade
20th-century Dutch women
21st-century Dutch women
Sportspeople from Overijssel